The men's marathon event at the 2006 Commonwealth Games was held on March 19.

Results

References
Results

Marathon
2006
Commonwealth
2006 Commonwealth Games